The Nonesuch is a Regency romance novel by Georgette Heyer. The story is set in 1816/1817.

Plot summary
Sir Waldo Hawkridge, known in London society as 'the Nonesuch' for his sporting abilities and perfect manners, is obliged to go into Yorkshire to inspect a property that he has just inherited. Sir Waldo is a very wealthy and philanthropic man, and intends to renovate the house to turn it into yet another of his charity orphanages. While there, he meets Tiffany Wield, a positively dazzling young heiress who is entirely selfish and possessed of a frightful temper, as well as her far more elegant companion-governess, Ancilla Trent. While Waldo's young cousin, Lord Lindeth, falls in and out of love with the young ladies of the neighborhood, Waldo must convince the practical Miss Trent that it is not above her station as a governess to fall in love with him.

Characters
Sir Waldo Hawkridge - the hero, 35. Known in London as "The Nonesuch". A famous Corinthian and the leader of Fashion.

Miss Ancilla Trent - the heroine, 26. The governess and companion of Miss Wield.

Miss Tiffany Wield - a spoiled heiress and the charge of Ancilla.

Julian, Lord Lindeth - an unambitious aristocrat and Sir Waldo's cousin.

Mrs. Underhill - the owner of Staples and Miss Wield's aunt.

Miss Patience Chartley - the daughter of the local rector.

Mr. Laurence Calver -  a dandy and Sir Waldo's other cousin.

Readers' reactions
Most of Heyer's novels center on London or Bath, but some of the novels have a more rural setting — and this novel, set in Yorkshire, is perhaps the most rural of her novels. The Nonesuch owes much to Jane Austen's Pride and Prejudice, as well as some debt to "governess novels" such as Jane Eyre. Some readers are delighted by The Nonesuch's use of Regency era slang (and perhaps some coinages by Heyer). Two examples are: "to make a cake of oneself", meaning "to make a fool of oneself" or "to embarrass oneself to the point of self-annihilation" — from making a "mincemeat pattie of oneself"; "to break the bustle", meaning "to spend too much money".

References

1962 British novels
Novels by Georgette Heyer
Historical novels
Fiction set in 1816
Fiction set in 1817
Novels set in Yorkshire
Heinemann (publisher) books
Regency romance novels